A hotel is an establishment that provides paid lodging on a short-term basis. Facilities provided inside a hotel room may range from a modest-quality mattress in a small room to large suites with bigger, higher-quality beds, a dresser, a refrigerator, and other kitchen facilities, upholstered chairs, a flat-screen television, and en-suite bathrooms. Small, lower-priced hotels may offer only the most basic guest services and facilities. Larger, higher-priced hotels may provide additional guest facilities such as a swimming pool, a business center with computers, printers, and other office equipment, childcare, conference and event facilities, tennis or basketball courts, gymnasium, restaurants, day spa, and social function services. Hotel rooms are usually numbered (or named in some smaller hotels and B&Bs) to allow guests to identify their room. Some boutique, high-end hotels have custom decorated rooms. Some hotels offer meals as part of a room and board arrangement. In Japan, capsule hotels provide a tiny room suitable only for sleeping and shared bathroom facilities.

The precursor to the modern hotel was the inn of medieval Europe. For a period of about 200 years from the mid-17th century, coaching inns served as a place for lodging for coach travelers. Inns began to cater to wealthier clients in the mid-18th century. One of the first hotels in a modern sense was opened in Exeter in 1768. Hotels proliferated throughout Western Europe and North America in the early 19th century, and luxury hotels began to spring up in the later part of the 19th century, paricularly in the United States.

Hotel operations vary in size, function, complexity, and cost. Most hotels and major hospitality companies have set industry standards to classify hotel types. An upscale full-service hotel facility offers luxury amenities, full-service accommodations, an on-site restaurant, and the highest level of personalized service, such as a concierge, room service, and clothes-ironing staff. Full-service hotels often contain upscale full-service facilities with many full-service accommodations, an on-site full-service restaurant, and a variety of on-site amenities. Boutique hotels are smaller independent, non-branded hotels that often contain upscale facilities. Small to medium-sized hotel establishments offer a limited amount of on-site amenities. Economy hotels are small to medium-sized hotel establishments that offer basic accommodations with little to no services. Extended stay hotels are small to medium-sized hotels that offer longer-term full-service accommodations compared to a traditional hotel.

Timeshare and destination clubs are a form of property ownership involving ownership of an individual unit of accommodation for seasonal usage. A motel is a small-sized low-rise lodging with direct access to individual rooms from the car parking area. Boutique hotels are typically hotels with a unique environment or intimate setting. A number of hotels and motels have entered the public consciousness through popular culture. Some hotels are built specifically as destinations in themselves, for example casinos and holiday resorts.

Most hotel establishments are run by a general manager who serves as the head executive (often referred to as the "hotel manager"), department heads who oversee various departments within a hotel (e.g., food service), middle managers, administrative staff, and line-level supervisors. The organizational chart and volume of job positions and hierarchy varies by hotel size, function and class, and is often determined by hotel ownership and managing companies.

Etymology

The word hotel is derived from the French hôtel (coming from the same origin as hospital), which referred to a French version of a building seeing frequent visitors, and providing care, rather than a place offering accommodation. In contemporary French usage, hôtel now has the same meaning as the English term, and hôtel particulier is used for the old meaning, as well as "hôtel" in some place names such as Hôtel-Dieu (in Paris), which has been a hospital since the Middle Ages. The French spelling, with the circumflex, was also used in English, but is now rare. The circumflex replaces the 's' found in the earlier hostel spelling, which over time took on a new, but closely related meaning. Grammatically, hotels usually take the definite article – hence "The Astoria Hotel" or simply "The Astoria".

History

Facilities offering hospitality to travellers featured in early civilizations. In Greco-Roman culture and in ancient Persia, hospitals for recuperation and rest were built at thermal baths. Guinness World Records officially recognised Japan's Nishiyama Onsen Keiunkan, founded in 705, as the oldest hotel in the world. During the Middle Ages, various religious orders at monasteries and abbeys would offer accommodation for travellers on the road.

The precursor to the modern hotel was the inn of medieval Europe, possibly dating back to the rule of Ancient Rome. These would provide for the needs of travellers, including food and lodging, stabling and fodder for the traveller's horses and fresh horses for mail coaches. Famous London examples of inns include the George and the Tabard. A typical layout of an inn featured an inner court with bedrooms on the two sides, with the kitchen and parlour at the front and the stables at the back.

For a period of about 200 years from the mid-17th century, coaching inns served as a place for lodging for coach travellers (in other words, a roadhouse). Coaching inns stabled teams of horses for stagecoaches and mail coaches and replaced tired teams with fresh teams. Traditionally they were seven miles apart, but this depended very much on the terrain.

Some English towns had as many as ten such inns and rivalry between them became intense, not only for the income from the stagecoach operators but for the revenue from the food and drink supplied to the wealthy passengers. By the end of the century, coaching inns were being run more professionally, with a regular timetable being followed and fixed menus for food.

Inns began to cater to richer clients in the mid-18th century, and consequently grew in grandeur and in the level of service provided. Sudhir Andrews traces "the birth of an organised hotel industry" to Europe's chalets and small hotels which catered primarily to aristocrats.
One of the first hotels in a modern sense, the Royal Clarence, opened in Exeter in 1768, although the idea only really caught on in the early-19th century. In 1812 Mivart's Hotel opened its doors in London, later changing its name to Claridge's.

Hotels proliferated throughout Western Europe and North America in the 19th century. Luxury hotels, including the 1829 Tremont House in Boston, the 1836 Astor House in New York City, the 1889 Savoy Hotel in London, and the Ritz chain of hotels in London and Paris in the late 1890s, catered to an ever more-wealthy clientele.

Title II of the Civil Rights Act of 1964 is part of a United States law that prohibits discrimination on the basis of race, religion, or national origin in places of public accommodation. Hotels are included as types of public accommodation in the Act.

International scale
Hotels cater to travelers from many countries and languages, since no one country dominates the travel industry.

Types
Hotel operations vary in size, function, and cost. Most hotels and major hospitality companies that operate hotels have set widely accepted industry standards to classify hotel types. General categories include the following:

International luxury

 
International luxury hotels offer high-quality amenities, full-service accommodations, on-site full-service restaurants, and the highest level of personalized and professional service in major or capital cities. International luxury hotels are classified with at least a Five Diamond rating or Five Star hotel rating depending on the country and local classification standards. Example brands include: Grand Hyatt, Conrad, InterContinental, Sofitel, Mandarin Oriental, Four Seasons, The Peninsula, Rosewood, JW Marriott and The Ritz-Carlton.

Lifestyle luxury resorts

Lifestyle luxury resorts are branded hotels that appeal to a guest with lifestyle or personal image in specific locations. They are typically full-service and classified as luxury. A key characteristic of lifestyle resorts is focus on providing a unique guest experience as opposed to simply providing lodging. Lifestyle luxury resorts are classified with a Five Star hotel rating depending on the country and local classification standards. Example brands include: Waldorf Astoria, St. Regis, Shangri-La, Oberoi, Belmond, Jumeirah, Aman, Taj Hotels, Hoshino, Raffles, Fairmont, Banyan Tree, Regent and Park Hyatt.

Upscale full-service
Upscale full-service hotels often provide a wide array of guest services and on-site facilities. Commonly found amenities may include: on-site food and beverage (room service and restaurants), meeting and conference services and facilities, fitness center, and business center. Upscale full-service hotels range in quality from upscale to luxury.  This classification is based upon the quality of facilities and amenities offered by the hotel. Examples include: W Hotels, Sheraton, Langham, Kempinski, 
Kimpton Hotels, Hilton, Lotte, Renaissance, Marriott and Hyatt Regency brands.

Boutique
Boutique hotels are smaller independent non-branded hotels that often contain mid-scale to upscale facilities of varying size in unique or intimate settings with full-service accommodations. These hotels are generally 100 rooms or fewer.

Focused or select service
Small to medium-sized hotel establishments that offer a limited number of on-site amenities that only cater and market to a specific demographic of travelers, such as the single business traveler. Most focused or select service hotels may still offer full-service accommodations but may lack leisure amenities such as an on-site restaurant or a swimming pool. Examples include Hyatt Place, Holiday Inn, Courtyard by Marriott and Hilton Garden Inn.

Economy and limited service
Small to medium-sized hotel establishments that offer a very limited number of on-site amenities and often only offer basic accommodations with little to no services, these facilities normally only cater and market to a specific demographic of travelers, such as the budget-minded traveler seeking a "no frills" accommodation. Limited service hotels often lack an on-site restaurant but in return may offer a limited complimentary food and beverage amenity such as on-site continental breakfast service.  Examples include Ibis Budget, Hampton Inn, Aloft, Holiday Inn Express, Fairfield Inn, and Four Points by Sheraton.

Extended stay
Extended stay hotels are small to medium-sized hotels that offer longer-term full-service accommodations compared to a traditional hotel. Extended stay hotels may offer non-traditional pricing methods such as a weekly rate that caters towards travelers in need of short-term accommodations for an extended period of time. Similar to limited and select service hotels, on-site amenities are normally limited and most extended stay hotels lack an on-site restaurant. Examples include Staybridge Suites, Candlewood Suites, Homewood Suites by Hilton, Home2 Suites by Hilton, Residence Inn by Marriott, Element, and Extended Stay America.

Timeshare and destination clubs
Timeshare and destination clubs are a form of property ownership also referred to as a vacation ownership involving the purchase and ownership of an individual unit of accommodation for seasonal usage during a specified period of time. Timeshare resorts often offer amenities similar that of a full-service hotel with on-site restaurants, swimming pools, recreation grounds, and other leisure-oriented amenities. Destination clubs on the other hand may offer more exclusive private accommodations such as private houses in a neighborhood-style setting. Examples of timeshare brands include Hilton Grand Vacations, Marriott Vacation Club International, Westgate Resorts, Disney Vacation Club, and Holiday Inn Club Vacations.

Motel
A motel, an abbreviation for "motor hotel", is a small-sized low-rise lodging establishment similar to a limited service, lower-cost hotel, but typically with direct access to individual rooms from the car park. Motels were built to serve road travellers, including travellers on road trip vacations and workers who drive for their job (travelling salespeople, truck drivers, etc.). Common during the 1950s and 1960s, motels were often located adjacent to a major highway, where they were built on inexpensive land at the edge of towns or along stretches of freeway.

New motel construction is rare in the 2000s as hotel chains have been building economy-priced, limited-service franchised properties at freeway exits which compete for largely the same clientele, largely saturating the market by the 1990s. Motels are still useful in less populated areas for driving travelers, but the more populated an area becomes, the more hotels move in to meet the demand for accommodation. While many motels are unbranded and independent, many of the other motels which remain in operation joined national franchise chains, often rebranding themselves as hotels, inns or lodges.  Some examples of chains with motels include EconoLodge, Motel 6, Super 8, and Travelodge.

Motels in some parts of the world are more often regarded as places for romantic assignations where rooms are often rented by the hour. This is fairly common in parts of Latin America.

Microstay
Hotels may offer rooms for microstays, a type of booking for less than 24 hours where the customer chooses the check in time and the length of the stay. This allows the hotel increased revenue by reselling the same room several times a day. They first gained popularity in Europe but are now common in major global tourist centers.

Management 

Hotel management is a globally accepted professional career field and academic field of study. Degree programs such as hospitality management studies, a business degree, and/or certification programs formally prepare hotel managers for industry practice.

Most hotel establishments consist of a general manager who serves as the head executive (often referred to as the "hotel manager"), department heads who oversee various departments within a hotel, middle managers, administrative staff, and line-level supervisors. The organizational chart and volume of job positions and hierarchy varies by hotel size, function, and is often determined by hotel ownership and managing companies.

Unique and specialty hotels

Historic inns and boutique hotels 

Boutique hotels are typically hotels with a unique environment or intimate setting.
Some hotels have gained their renown through tradition, by hosting significant events or persons, such as Schloss Cecilienhof in Potsdam, Germany, which derives its fame from the Potsdam Conference of the World War II allies Winston Churchill, Harry Truman and Joseph Stalin in 1945. The Taj Mahal Palace & Tower in Mumbai is one of India's most famous and historic hotels because of its association with the Indian independence movement. Some establishments have given name to a particular meal or beverage, as is the case with the Waldorf Astoria in New York City, United States where the Waldorf Salad was first created or the Hotel Sacher in Vienna, Austria, home of the Sachertorte. Others have achieved fame by association with dishes or cocktails created on their premises, such as the Hotel de Paris where the crêpe Suzette was invented or the Raffles Hotel in Singapore, where the Singapore Sling cocktail was devised.

A number of hotels have entered the public consciousness through popular culture, such as the Ritz Hotel in London, through its association with Irving Berlin's song, "Puttin' on the Ritz". The Algonquin Hotel in New York City is famed as the meeting place of the literary group, the Algonquin Round Table, and Hotel Chelsea, also in New York City, has been the subject of a number of songs and the scene of the stabbing of Nancy Spungen (allegedly by her boyfriend Sid Vicious).

Resort hotels
  
Some hotels are built specifically as a destination in itself to create a captive trade, example at casinos, amusement parks and holiday resorts. Though hotels have always been built in popular destinations, the defining characteristic of a resort hotel is that it exists purely to serve another attraction, the two having the same owners.

On the Las Vegas Strip there is a tradition of one-upmanship with luxurious and extravagant hotels in a concentrated area. This trend now has extended to other resorts worldwide, but the concentration in Las Vegas is still the world's highest: nineteen of the world's twenty-five largest hotels by room count are on the Strip, with a total of over 67,000 rooms.

Bunker hotels
The Null Stern Hotel in Teufen, Appenzellerland, Switzerland, and the Concrete Mushrooms in Albania are former nuclear bunkers transformed into hotels.

Cave hotels
The Cuevas Pedro Antonio de Alarcón (named after the author) in Guadix, Spain, as well as several hotels in Cappadocia, Turkey, are notable for being built into natural cave formations, some with rooms underground. The Desert Cave Hotel in Coober Pedy, South Australia, is built into the remains of an opal mine.

Cliff hotels

Located on the coast but high above sea level, these hotels offer unobstructed panoramic views and a great sense of privacy without the feeling of total isolation. Some examples from around the globe are the Riosol Hotel in Gran Canaria, Caruso Belvedere Hotel in Amalfi Coast (Italy), Aman Resorts Amankila in Bali, Birkenhead House in Hermanus (South Africa), The Caves in Jamaica and Caesar Augustus in Capri.

Capsule hotels

Capsule hotels are a type of economical hotel first introduced in Japan, where people sleep in stacks of rectangular containers. In the sleeping capsules, beside the bed, the customer can watch TV, put the valuable items in the mini safes, and the customers also can use the wireless internet.

Day room hotels
Some hotels fill daytime occupancy with day rooms, for example, Rodeway Inn and Suites near Port Everglades in Fort Lauderdale, Florida. Day rooms are booked in a block of hours typically between 8 am and 5 pm, before the typical night shift. These are similar to transit hotels in that they appeal to travelers, however, unlike transit hotels, they do not eliminate the need to go through Customs.

Garden hotels
Garden hotels, famous for their gardens before they became hotels, include Gravetye Manor, the home of garden designer William Robinson, and Cliveden, designed by Charles Barry with a rose garden by Geoffrey Jellicoe.

Ice, snow and igloo hotels

The Ice Hotel in Jukkasjärvi, Sweden, was the first ice hotel in the world; first built in 1990, it is built each winter and melts every spring. The Hotel de Glace in Duschenay, Canada, opened in 2001 and it is North America's only ice hotel. It is redesigned and rebuilt in its entirety every year. 
Ice hotels can also be included within larger ice complexes; for example, the Mammut Snow Hotel in Finland is located within the walls of the Kemi snow castle; and the Lainio Snow Hotel is part of a snow village near Ylläs, Finland. There is an arctic snowhotel in Rovaniemi in Lapland, Finland, along with glass igloos. The first glass igloos were built in 1999 in Finland, they became the Kakslauttanen Arctic Resort with 65 buildings, 53 small ones for two people and 12 large ones for four people. Glass igloos, with their roof made of thermal glass, allow guests to admire auroras comfortably from their beds.

Love hotels

A love hotel (also 'love motel', especially in Taiwan) is a type of short-stay hotel found around the world, operated primarily for the purpose of allowing guests privacy for sexual activities, typically for one to three hours, but with overnight as an option. Styles of premises vary from extremely low-end to extravagantly appointed. In Japan, love hotels have a history of over 400 years.

Portable modular hotels
In 2021 a New York-based company introduced new modular and movable hotel rooms which allow landowners and hospitality groups to create and easily scale hotel accommodations. The portable units can be built in three to five months and can be stacked to create multi-floor units.

Referral hotel

A referral hotel is a hotel chain that offers branding to independently operated hotels; the chain itself is founded by or owned by the member hotels as a group. Many former referral chains have been converted to franchises; the largest surviving member-owned chain is Best Western.

Railway hotels

The first recorded purpose-built railway hotel was the Great Western Hotel, which opened adjacent to Reading railway station in 1844, shortly after the Great Western Railway opened its line from London. The building still exists, and although it has been used for other purposes over the years, it is now again a hotel and a member of the Malmaison hotel chain.

Frequently, expanding railway companies built grand hotels at their termini, such as the Midland Hotel, Manchester next to the former Manchester Central Station, and in London the ones above St Pancras railway station and Charing Cross railway station. London also has the Chiltern Court Hotel above Baker Street tube station, there are also Canada's grand railway hotels. They are or were mostly, but not exclusively, used by those traveling by rail.

Straw bale hotels 
The Maya Guesthouse in Nax Mont-Noble in the Swiss Alps, is the first hotel in Europe built entirely with straw bales.

Transit hotels

Transit hotels are short stay hotels typically used at international airports where passengers can stay while waiting to change airplanes.  The hotels are typically on the airside and do not require a visa for a stay or re-admission through security checkpoints.

Treehouse hotels
Some hotels are built with living trees as structural elements, for example the Treehotel near Piteå, Sweden, the Costa Rica Tree House near the Jairo Mora Sandoval Gandoca-Manzanillo Mixed Wildlife Refuge, Costa Rica; the Treetops Hotel in Aberdare National Park, Kenya; the Ariau Towers near Manaus, Brazil, on the Rio Negro in the Amazon; and Bayram's Tree Houses in Olympos, Turkey.

Underwater hotels

Some hotels have accommodation underwater, such as Utter Inn in Lake Mälaren, Sweden. Hydropolis, project in Dubai, would have had suites on the bottom of the Persian Gulf, and Jules' Undersea Lodge in Key Largo, Florida, requires scuba diving to access its rooms.

Overwater hotels

A resort island is an island or an archipelago that contains resorts, hotels, overwater bungalows, restaurants, tourist attractions and its amenities. Maldives has the most overwater bungalows resorts.

Yurt hotels
Yurts are circular, self-supporting structures with long rafters coalescing toward a central dome. During the day, the dome allows sunlight to illuminate the entire yurt interior, while moonlight and starlight shine through the dome at night.

Other specialty hotels

 The Burj al-Arab hotel in Dubai, United Arab Emirates, built on an artificial island, is structured in the shape of a boat's sail.
The Library Hotel in New York City, is unique in that each of its ten floors is assigned one category from the Dewey Decimal System.
 The Jailhotel Löwengraben in Lucerne, Switzerland is a converted prison now used as a hotel.
 The Luxor, a hotel and casino on the Las Vegas Strip in Paradise, Nevada, United States is unusual due to its pyramidal structure.
 The Liberty Hotel in Boston used to be the Charles Street Jail.
 Hotel Kakslauttanen in Finland, a collection of glass igloos in Lapland that allow you to watch the Northern Lights
 Built in Scotland and completed in 1936, The former ocean liner  in Long Beach, California, United States uses its first-class staterooms as a hotel, after retiring in 1967 from Transatlantic service.
 The Wigwam Motels used patented novelty architecture in which each motel room was a free-standing concrete wigwam or teepee.

 Various Caboose Motel or Red Caboose Inn properties are built from decommissioned rail cars.
Throughout the world there are several hotels built from converted airliners.

Records

Largest 

In 2006, Guinness World Records listed the First World Hotel in Genting Highlands, Malaysia, as the world's largest hotel with a total of 6,118 rooms (and which has now expanded to 7,351 rooms). The Izmailovo Hotel in Moscow has the most beds, with 7,500, followed by The Venetian and The Palazzo complex in Las Vegas (7,117 rooms) and MGM Grand Las Vegas complex (6,852 rooms).

Oldest
According to the Guinness Book of World Records, the oldest hotel in operation is the Nisiyama Onsen Keiunkan in Yamanashi, Japan. The hotel, first opened in AD 707, has been operated by the same family for forty-six generations. The title was held until 2011 by the Hoshi Ryokan, in the Awazu Onsen area of Komatsu, Japan, which opened in the year 718, as the history of the Nisiyama Onsen Keiunkan was virtually unknown.

Highest 
The Rosewood Guangzhou located on the top floors of the 108-story Guangzhou CTF Finance Centre in Tianhe District, Guangzhou, China. Soaring to 530-meters at its highest point, earns the singular status as the world's highest hotel.

Most expensive purchase 
In October 2014, the Anbang Insurance Group, based in China, purchased the Waldorf Astoria New York in Manhattan for US$1.95 billion, making it the world's most expensive hotel ever sold.

Long term residence  

A number of public figures have notably chosen to take up semi-permanent or permanent residence in hotels.
Fashion designer Coco Chanel lived in the Hôtel Ritz, Paris, on and off for more than 30 years.
Inventor Nikola Tesla lived the last ten years of his life at the New Yorker Hotel until he died in his room in 1943.
Larry Fine (of The Three Stooges) and his family lived in hotels, due to his extravagant spending habits and his wife's dislike for housekeeping. They first lived in the President Hotel in Atlantic City, New Jersey, where his daughter Phyllis was raised, then the Knickerbocker Hotel in Hollywood. Not until the late 1940s did Fine buy a home in the Los Feliz area of Los Angeles.
The Waldorf-Astoria Hotel and its affiliated Waldorf Towers has been the home of many famous persons over the years including former President Herbert Hoover who lived there from the end of his presidency in 1933 until his death in 1964. General Douglas MacArthur lived his last 14 years in the penthouse of the Waldorf Towers. Composer Cole Porter spent the last 25 years of his life in an apartment at the Waldorf Towers.
Billionaire Howard Hughes lived in hotels during the last ten years of his life (1966–76), primarily in Las Vegas, as well as Acapulco, Beverly Hills, Boston, Freeport, London, Managua, Nassau, Vancouver, and others.
Vladimir Nabokov and his wife Vera lived in the Montreux Palace Hotel in Montreux, Switzerland, from 1961 until his death in 1977.
Actor Richard Harris lived at the Savoy Hotel while in London. Hotel archivist Susan Scott recounts an anecdote that, when he was being taken out of the building on a stretcher shortly before his death in 2002, he raised his hand and told the diners "it was the food."
Egyptian actor Ahmed Zaki lived his last 15 years in Ramses Hilton Hotel – Cairo.
British entrepreneur Jack Lyons lived in the Hotel Mirador Kempinski in Switzerland for several years until his death in 2008.
American actress Elaine Stritch lived in the Savoy Hotel in London for over a decade.
Uruguayan-Argentinian tango composer Horacio Ferrer lived almost 40 years, from 1976 until his death in 2014, in an apartment inside the Alvear Palace Hotel, in Buenos Aires, one of the most exclusive hotels in the city.

See also

 Lists of hotels
 List of chained-brand hotels
 List of defunct hotel chains
 Casino hotel
 List of casino hotels
 Niche tourism markets
 Resort

Industry and careers

 Bellhop
 Concierge
 Front desk clerk, a type of clerk
 General manager
 GOPPAR, RevPAR, TRevPAR – hotel profitability equations.
 Hospitality industry
 Hotel rating
 Innkeeper
 Night auditor
 Property caretaker
 Tourism

Human habitation types

 Apartment hotel
 Boutique hotel
 Caravanserai
 Cruise ship
 Dharamshala
 Dak bungalow
 Eco hotel
 Guest house
 Glamping
 Homestay
 Hostal
 Human habitats
 Inn
 Serviced apartment
 Vacation rental
 Pop-up hotel

References

Further reading

External links

 
Buildings and structures by type
 
Tourist accommodations